Hunter is a town in Garfield County, Oklahoma, United States. The population was 165 at the 2010 census, a 4.6 percent decline from the figure of 173 in 2000.

Geography
Hunter is located at  (36.563118, -97.660669).

Demographics

As of the census of 2000, there were 173 people, 74 households, and 50 families residing in the town. There were 96 housing units at an average density of 391.0 per square mile (148.3/km2). The racial makeup of the town was 99.42% White and 0.58% Native American.

There were 74 households, out of which 25.7% had children under the age of 18 living with them, 62.2% were married couples living together, 1.4% had a female householder with no husband present, and 32.4% were non-families. 31.1% of all households were made up of individuals, and 20.3% had someone living alone who was 65 years of age or older. The average household size was 2.34 and the average family size was 2.94.

In the town, the population was spread out, with 21.4% under the age of 18, 5.2% from 18 to 24, 23.1% from 25 to 44, 30.1% from 45 to 64, and 20.2% who were 65 years of age or older. The median age was 45 years. For every 100 females, there were 92.2 males. For every 100 females age 18 and over, there were 100.0 males.

The median income for a household in the town was $25,625, and the median income for a family was $33,333. Males had a median income of $28,750 versus $13,750 for females. The per capita income for the town was $11,731. About 13.0% of families and 17.1% of the population were below the poverty line, including 26.4% of those under the age of 81 and none of those 65 or over.

References

External links
 Encyclopedia of Oklahoma History and Culture - Hunter

Towns in Garfield County, Oklahoma
Towns in Oklahoma